Boris Baratov is a screenwriter, filmmaker  and the author of dozens of films. Boris Baratov written numerous books about scholars and writers, many of his films were based on Armenia. The architectural monuments of Artsakh and of the most ancient Christian, together with its history and culture.

“The Armeniad 's visible pages of history,” chronicles the ancient kingdoms of Armenia and the impact they had on Armenian and world history.

Books 
“Bogdan Saltanov” [1986] 
“Leonardo da Vinci” [1987]
A train ride to the past, the present and the future
Paradise Laid Waste: A Journey to Karabakh

Films 
“The Dance,”
“Stones,” 
“The Round Table” 
“Holy Etchmiadzin”

References

External links 
Biography of Boris Baratov

Living people
Year of birth missing (living people)
Armenian film directors